Turanshah may refer to:

Shams ad-Din Turanshah (d. 1180), brother of Saladin, ruler of Yemen, Baalbek and Damascus
Al-Mu'azzam Turanshah ibn Salah al-Din (d. 1260), son of Saladin
Al-Mu'azzam Turanshah, son of as-Salih Ayyub and ruler of Egypt (1249–50)
Turan Shahr, village in Iran